Kol Chai Hatch End Reform Jewish Community, a member of the Movement for Reform Judaism, is a Reform Jewish congregation at 434 Uxbridge Road, Hatch End, Pinner in the London Borough of Harrow. It was founded in March 1987.  

Its Rabbi (since September 2017) is Naomi Goldman.

See also
 List of Jewish communities in the United Kingdom
 List of former synagogues in the United Kingdom
 Movement for Reform Judaism

References

External links 
 
 A history of Kol Chai
 The Movement for Reform Judaism
 Kol Chai – Hatch End Jewish Community on Jewish Communities and Records – UK (hosted by jewishgen.org)

1987 establishments in England
20th-century synagogues
Jewish organizations established in 1987
Pinner
Reform synagogues in the United Kingdom
Religion in the London Borough of Harrow